Triodon may refer to:

Triodon (book), a liturgical book of the Orthodox Church
Triodon (fish), a genus of fish in the family Triodontidae
Triodon (plant), a genus of plants now synonymized with Diodia